Adam Moltke may refer to:

 Adam Gottlob Moltke (1710–1792), Danish courtier, statesman and diplomat
 Adam Wilhelm Moltke (1785–1864), Prime Minister of Denmark